Time in Place is the third studio album by guitarist Mike Stern, released in 1988 through Atlantic Records and reissued on September 18, 2007 through Wounded Bird Records.

Track listing

Personnel
Musicians
Mike Stern – guitar
Jim Beard – keyboard
Peter Erskine – drums
Don Alias – percussion
Jeff Andrews – bass
Bob Berg – tenor and soprano saxophone (tracks 2–6)
Michael Brecker – tenor saxophone (tracks 1, 7)
Don Grolnick – organ (track 4)

Production
Steve Khan – producer
Christine Martin – producer (associate)
Malcolm Pollack – engineer, mixing engineer
Kevin Halpin – engineer
Tom Durack – engineer
Dary Sulich – engineer (assistant)
Ed Brooks – engineer (assistant)
Greg Calbi – mastering engineer

References

External links
In Review: Mike Stern "Time In Place" at Guitar Nine Records

Mike Stern albums
1988 albums
Atlantic Records albums